Gloria Fonda (1896 - January 20, 1978) was a U.S. actress of the silent film era. She was from St. Paul, Minnesota.

Brief Movie Career
Fonda won a most beautiful girl in Washington pageant sponsored by Universal Pictures. Her home was in Seattle, Washington. She came to Hollywood with sixty other beauties from American states.

Fonda made only seven films during a career which lasted from 1915–1916. Often she appeared in movies directed by William C. Dowlan. Among these are The Mayor's Decision (1915), The Devil and Idle Hands (1915), and Drugged Waters (1916).

She played the role of Gladys Saunders in the latter, her final film. Released by Red Feather Productions, the drama concerned a health resort and a spring of water which was pure. The water was drugged daily
in order to deceive wealthy people who came to the spa to restore their health. The Mayor's Decision was a short drama of politics, slum life, and double intrigue. It was a Universal and Carl Laemmle production.

Dowlan directed Fonda in a Laemmle single reel picture entitled
The Great Fear (1915). Dowlan co-starred along with Lula Warrenton.

Death
Gloria Fonda died in Álamos, Sonora, Mexico in 1978.

References
Frederick Post, The Star, High Class Photoplays, March 16, 1916, Page 6.
Syracuse Herald, Seen On The Screen, April 13, 1916, Page 22.

External links

1896 births
1978 deaths
American film actresses
American silent film actresses
Actresses from Saint Paul, Minnesota
20th-century American actresses